Odisha Fire Service (OFS) is the state owned service that attends firefighting/rescue calls throughout the Indian state of Odisha. It was established in 1944 during World War II in response to the threat of possible attacks from Japan. In 1945, it became part of the Odisha State Police. The fire service consists of 153 fire stations. As of 2008, there were 1,962 personnel with over 350 fire appliances at their disposal. OFS is headed by a Director, who has the rank of Inspector General of Police and is under the administrative control of the Odisha State Home Department. The Odisha Fire Service Act, 1993 governs the fire prevention measures, lays down fire safety norms, and also mandates the formation of a fire service.

References

State agencies of Odisha
Fire departments of India
1944 establishments in India